Bernard Briand (born 1974) is a French politician from Archipelago Tomorrow. He has been President of the Territorial Council of Saint-Pierre-et-Miquelon since 13 October 2020.

References 

1974 births
Living people
21st-century French politicians
Presidents of the Territorial Council of Saint Pierre and Miquelon

French schoolteachers